Isojapyx is a genus of diplurans in the family Japygidae.

Species
 Isojapyx eidemani Silvestri, 1948
 Isojapyx excitus (Silvestri, 1930)
 Isojapyx scopiferus Silvestri, 1948

References

Diplura